The Sun Way 21 is a French sailboat that was designed by J&J Design as a cruiser and first built in 1989.

Production
The design was built by Jeanneau in France, from 1989 to 1995, with 532 boats completed, but it is now out of production.

Design
The Sun Way 21 is a recreational keelboat, built predominantly of polyester fiberglass, with wood trim. The hull is solid fiberglass, while the deck has a balsa core. There is also injected foam that makes the boat unsinkable. It has a 7/8 fractional sloop rig, with a deck-stepped pivoting mast, one set of swept spreaders and aluminum spars with continuous stainless steel wire rigging. The hull has a raked stem, a walk-through reverse transom, an internally mounted spade-type rudder controlled by a tiller and a fixed fin keel or optional stub keel and steel centerboard, with a folding rudder. The fin keel model displaces  and carries  of cast iron ballast, while the centerboard version displaces  and carries  of cast iron external ballast.

The boat is normally fitted with a small  outboard motor for docking and maneuvering.

The design has sleeping accommodation for four people, with a double "V"-berth in the bow cabin and two straight settees in the main cabin around a rectangular table.

See also
List of sailing boat types

References

External links

Photo of a Sun Way 21

Keelboats
1980s sailboat type designs
Trailer sailers
Sailboat type designs by J&J Design
Sailboat types built by Jeanneau